Siegfried Herbert Horn (March 17, 1908 – November 28, 1993) was a Seventh-day Adventist archaeologist and Bible scholar. He is best known for his excavations at Heshbon in Jordan and Shechem in the West Bank. He was Professor of History of Antiquity at the Seventh-day Adventist Theological Seminary in Berrien Springs, Michigan (now part of Andrews University). The Siegfried H. Horn Museum at Andrews University was named in his honor. An educator of wide-ranging interests and abilities, his areas of specialty were Ancient Near Eastern chronology and archaeology.

Biography
Horn was born March 17, 1908, to Albin and Klara Horn in Wurzen, Saxony, Germany. His father was one of the world's earliest aviators, trained as a pilot by Louis Blériot.  Horn served as a minister and as a missionary from 1930 to 1940, first in the Netherlands and then in the Dutch East Indies.  Because he was German, Horn spent six and a half years as a prisoner of war during World War II, from 1940 to 1946, first as a prisoner of the Dutch in Indonesia and then imprisoned by the English in India.  Granted access to books, Horn made use of this time to develop his skills in Greek and Hebrew and to teach his fellow inmates.  Upon gaining his freedom at the end of World War II, Horn immigrated to the United States and completed his education.  He earned a B.A. at Walla Walla College (now a University) in Washington State (1947), an M.A. at the Seventh-day Adventist Theological Seminary in Washington, D.C. (1948), and a Ph.D. in Egyptology at the Oriental Institute of the University of Chicago (1951).  He studied briefly under William F. Albright at Johns Hopkins University.

Horn taught at the Adventist Theological Seminary from 1951 to 1976.  He started an archaeological museum (later named for him), was the founding editor of the journal Andrews University Seminary Studies, and started up the Seminary's doctoral programs. Horn also initiated and directed the Heshbon expedition, an archaeological dig at Tell Hesban thought to be the location of Biblical Heshbon.  The dig at Hesban eventually developed into the Madaba Plains Project, with excavations at Hesban, Umayri, and Jalul.  Horn also dug at Tell Balatah, biblical Shechem, in the early 1960s.  Horn died of lymphoma on November 28, 1993, in St. Helena, California, at the age of 85.

See also

References

 Joyce Rochat, Survivor (Berrien Springs, MI: Andrews University Press, 1986), a biography of Horn's early life
 I. J. Gelb, "Two Assyrian King Lists" Journal of Near Eastern Studies, 13:4 (1954), p. 209–230.
 Lawrence T. Geraty, "A Tribute to Siegfried H. Horn, March 17, 1908 – November 28, 1993: In Memoriam" Biblical Archaeologist, 57:1 (1994), pp. 58–59.
 Siegfried H. Horn, "A Revolution in the Early Chronology of Western Asia," Ministry 30:6 (1957), p. 4–8.
 Siegfried H. Horn, Promise Deferred (Hagerstown, MD: Review and Herald, 1987), an autobiography.
 The Archaeology of Jordan and Other Studies ed. Lawrence T. Geraty and Larry Herr (Berrien Springs, MI: Andrew University Press, 1986), a Festschrift (honorary book dedicated to him)

External links
 Siegfried H. Horn Museum
 Articles by Horn as catalogued in the Seventh-day Adventist Periodical Index (SDAPI)
 Madaba Plains Project
 Hesban Excavations
Recent Discoveries Confirm the Bible, 1952 Bible Conference, Sept. 2 presentation, mp3 format
 Siegfried Horn: Dialogue With an Adventist Archaeologist College and University Dialogue Retrieved September 28, 2018

1908 births
1993 deaths
People from Wurzen
American biblical scholars
Seventh-day Adventist theologians
German Seventh-day Adventists
Andrews University faculty
Walla Walla University alumni
People from St. Helena, California
Seventh-day Adventist biblical scholars
20th-century American archaeologists
Historians from California